Chromosome 15 open reading frame 52 is a human protein encoded by the C15orf52 gene, its function is poorly understood.

Gene

C15orf52 is a gene located on the reverse strand of chromosome 15 in the species Homo sapiens at locus 15q15.1. The gene is 9,516 base pairs long including introns and exons. The gene contains 12 distinct introns, 11 exons, produces 7 different mRNAs, and 6 alternatively spliced variants.

Promoter
The promoter region upstream of the gene contains several transcription factors that regulate the expression of the C15orf52 gene.

mRNA

The linear mRNA is 5344 base pairs long. The mRNA contains a short 5’ untranslated region of 15 base pairs and a long 3’ untranslated region of 3782 base pairs. In the long 3' untranslated region, three specific miRNA binding sites were found for has-miR-147b, hsa-miR-203a-3p.1, and has-miR-214-5p miRNAs.

Protein

General Properties
The protein contains a domain of unknown function (DUF4594 from amino acid 185 to 350). The protein, C15orf52, is a 534 amino acid long protein weighing 57.325 kDa found in Homo sapiens.

Structure

Primary
Comparison of the amino acid composition to "Homo sapiens" revealed certain amino acids with differing frequencies than other proteins in humans. Phenylalanine, Tyrosine, and Asparagine were all found in lower frequencies than other proteins in humans. Glycine and Arginine were found at higher frequencies than other proteins in humans. The isoelectric point of the protein is 9.457, indicating a basic protein at a normal physiological pH of 7.4.

Secondary
C15orf52 has a coiled coil domain spanning amino acids 60-97 containing alpha helices.

Tertiary
The tertiary structure of this protein is still unknown to the scientific community and is often up for debate.

Subcellular Localization
There are no transmembrane sequences detected in the C15orf52 protein. C15orf52 is also predicted to be a non-cytoplasmic soluble protein likely to be found as a nuclear protein.

Post-Translational Modifications
The protein has been experimentally observed with phosphorylation at serines found at two locations, S201  and S392. N-terminal acetylations, C-glycosylations, glycations, leucine rich nuclear export signals, sumoylation, and PEST motifs were all predicted across orthologs for this protein.

Interacting Proteins
Two proteins, THO complex subunit 1 (THOC1) and THO complex subunit 7 (THOC7) were found to interact with C15orf52 using anti-tag coimmunoprecipitation. THOC1 is a component of the THO cubcomplex of the TREX complex that is thought to couple mRNA transcription, processing and nuclear export. It is also involved in an apoptotic pathway characterized by activation of caspase-6. THOC7 is also part of the same subcomplex and is required for efficient export of polyadenylated RNA. 
Ring finger protein 2 (RNF2) and SUZ12 polycomb repressive complex 2 subunit (SUZ12) were also indicated as interacting proteins. RNF2 is part of a polycomb group of proteins that are important for transcription repression of various genes. It also possess ubiquitin ligase activity. SUZ12 is also a polycomb group protein and part of a complex that methylates lysines of histones and also is involved with repression of genes.

Homology

Paralogs
There are no known complete paralogs for the C15orf52 protein. There is a homologous domain found in Coiled Coil Domain Containing Protein 9 (CCDC9) that is paralogous to the C15orf52 protein from amino acid 9 to 55 of CCDC9. This domain is found in primates to mollusks. This CCDC9 domain is not found in any unicellular organisms or multicellular organisms more distant than mollusks.

Orthologs 
Orthologs of the C15orf52 protein were traced back to cartilaginous fishes. None were found in any multicellular organisms more distant than cartilaginous fishes or unicellular organisms.

Divergence
A comparison of the corrected distances of C15orf52 with the rapidly mutating Fibrinogen Alpha protein and the slowly mutating Cytochrome C protein is shown below. The paralogous domain in CCDC9 is also shown below. Overall, C15orf52 changes fairly rapidly as a whole, however the paralogous domain does not, which may point to functionality as this domain is well conserved.

Expression 
Origin of cDNAs of C15orf52 shows that the gene is expressed in numerous locations such as primary and secondary digestive organs (pancreas, stomach, liver, etc.), nervous system (brain, retina, lens), skin, reproductive organs, bones, and many other tissues suggesting a fairly nonspecialized function. However, C15orf52 protein is relatively over-expressed in the colon, peripheral blood mononuclear cells, testis, and rectum. Application of RNA-seq to plasma extracellular RNA profiles indicated C15orf52 as the most abundant mRNA present, possibly indicating some role outside of the cell. In mice, the expression pattern of C15orf52, as well as TCEA3 and FHOD3, two other genes studied, was found to be similar to that of well-characterized genes known to be associated with heart development such as BVES and CXCL12. However C15orf52 was not detected before embryological day 9.5 in the tail area and its exact function is not yet known.

Clinical Significance
Diseases associated with C15orf52 include colorectal cancer where the protein was over-expressed in tumor cells.

References

Uncharacterized proteins